Nikola "Mitko" Karčev (born 31 March 1981) is a Macedonian football coach and a former international defender. He is the manager of Borec.

Club career
Karčev started his career on the youth team of FK Partizan in Serbia before moving back to Macedonia to play with FK Borec, FK Pelister and FK Rabotnički. He went to Albanian team KF Elbasani for the 2007–08 season and was elected the best player of the team.

In 2010, Karčev moved to Shanghai East Asia, becoming an integral member of the team's backfield.

In the summer of 2011 he returned to Serbia, signing with SuperLiga side FK Metalac G.M.

International career
He made his debut for the Macedonian national team in 2005 in a tournament played in Iran, where he played in both matches played by the team. His third and final international was a December 2010 friendly match against China.

References

External links
 

1981 births
Footballers from Skopje
Living people
Association football central defenders
Macedonian footballers
North Macedonia under-21 international footballers
North Macedonia international footballers
FK Borec players
FK Pelister players
FK Rabotnički players
KF Elbasani players
FC Akhmat Grozny players
FK Vardar players
Shanghai Port F.C. players
FK Metalac Gornji Milanovac players
Yangon United F.C. players
FK Teteks players
Macedonian First Football League players
Kategoria Superiore players
Russian Premier League players
China League One players
Serbian SuperLiga players
Myanmar National League players
Macedonian expatriate footballers
Expatriate footballers in Albania
Macedonian expatriate sportspeople in Albania
Expatriate footballers in Russia
Macedonian expatriate sportspeople in Russia
Expatriate footballers in China
Macedonian expatriate sportspeople in China
Expatriate footballers in Serbia
Macedonian expatriate sportspeople in Serbia
Expatriate footballers in Myanmar
Macedonian expatriate sportspeople in Myanmar
Macedonian football managers
FK Borec managers
Macedonian expatriate football managers
Expatriate football managers in Germany
Macedonian expatriate sportspeople in Germany
Expatriate football managers in Uzbekistan
Macedonian expatriate sportspeople in Uzbekistan